Echo Passage is a collaborative album by ambient musicians Alio Die (Stefano Musso) and Vidna Obmana (Dirk Serries). The album was originally released in 1999 on the Italian label Musica Maxima Magnetica and was reissued on Projekt Records in 2006.

Track listing

 "Echo Passage (Echoes of Light—A Slip of Darkness—The Passage)" - 68:32

Personnel

 Vidna Obmana - Electronics, loops, recycling and various acoustics.
 Alio Die - Samples, treatments, textures and drones.

References

See also
Echo Passage at Musica Maxima Magnetica
Vidna Obmana
Ambient music
Electronic music

1999 albums
Projekt Records albums
Ambient albums